Quinten Michael Dormady (born February 19, 1996) is an American football quarterback for the Orlando Guardians of the XFL. He played college football for Tennessee before a season-ending injury in 2017 caused him to transfer to Houston. He then played at Central Michigan. He also played for the Montreal Alouettes of the Canadian Football League (CFL).

Early life and high school career 
Dormady was born on February 19, 1996, in West Union, Iowa. He attended, played football, and baseball for Boerne High School in Boerne, Texas, where he played football for his father, Mike. 

As a sophomore in 2012 he threw for 3,010 yards and 27 touchdowns and was named an honorable mention All-State. He missed his junior year with a torn labrum.

As a senior in 2014 he threw for 2,893 yards and 32 touchdowns and led the team to an 8–3 record and a playoff berth. He threw for 409 yards in the season-opener.

College career

Tennessee 
Dormady committed to Tennessee in 2014. as a true freshman in 2015 he made his college football debut in the season opener against Bowling Green. He played in six games on the year against Bowling Green, Western Carolina, North Texas, Vanderbilt and in the team's Outback Bowl appearance against Northwestern. He threw his first-career touchdown pass to Preston Williams against Western Carolina. He finished the game going six of eight for 93 yards. 

Dormady's role diminished in 2016 in his sophomore year as he only appeared in four games. He made his season debut in the team's win over Virginia Tech in the Battle at Bristol. He threw his season-long 36 yard pass against Alabama when he came in relief in the fourth quarter. He played the most against Tennessee Tech as he came off the bench and finished nine of thirteen for 109 yards.

Entering 2017 Dormady was named the starter. In the first week of the season he and John Kelly Jr. led the Volunteers past Georgia Tech in a 42–41 double-overtime win. He threw for a career-high 221 yards and two interceptions. The following week against FCS opponent Indiana State he again had two touchdown passes. The team would lose to No. 24 Florida 20–26 as Dormady threw for a career-high 259 yards but his three interceptions did not help the team. After beating UMass, he would struggle against Georgia and would be shut down for the season after battling a shoulder injury caused prior to the team's loss to Florida. Following the season Dormady announced that he was going to transfer from the team.

Houston 
In 2018 Dormady transferred to Houston. Due to his injury sustained the previous season he only played in one game for the Cougars. He made his debut against Arizona as he threw for eight yards in the team's win. He would be redshirted and transfer after the season.

Central Michigan 
In 2019, Dormady transferred for a second time to Central Michigan. He started in all ten games he played in for the Chippewas. He made his debut against Albany where he threw for 285 yards and three touchdowns. After losing to No. 17 Wisconsin, Dormady missed the next four game with an injury. He threw for multiple touchdowns against New Mexico State in his return from injury, Buffalo, and Northern Illinois. Against Ball State he threw a season-high 365 yards and led a seventeen-point second-half comeback. Against Miami of Ohio he threw for 232 yards and a touchdown in the MAC Championship Game win. Central Michigan earned a bid in the New Mexico Bowl where they faced San Diego State. In the final game of his career he went eleven of 26 for 164 yards and three interceptions as the team could only score eleven points opposed to the Aztecs' 48.

Statistics

Professional career

Montreal Alouettes 
On December 15, 2020, Dormady signed with the Montreal Alouettes of the Canadian Football League (CFL).

On October 14, 2021, he resigned with the Alouettes following a try-out with the Green Bay Packers of the National Football League (NFL).

On May 9, 2022, he was released.

Orlando Guardians 
On November 16, 2022, Dormady was assigned to the Orlando Guardians of the XFL. He made his debut in the XFL late in the fourth quarter in reserve for starter Paxton Lynch. He would throw a 51-yard touchdown pass to Andrew Jamiel to score the second and final touchdown of the game for the Guardians. 

He was released on March 3, 2023, after allegedly giving a rival team plays from the Guardians' playbook. He was reinstated a day later, on March 4, 2023, when the league released a statement saying they would be investigating into the situation. He was subsequently placed on the team's reserve list. After undergoing a third party investigation, it was found that there was no substantial proof behind the allegations, and Dormandy was added back to the active roster.

Career XFL statistics

Personal life 
Dormady is the son of Mike and Lisa Dormady. His father, Mike, coached his high school football team.

References

External links 
 Tennessee Volunteers bio
 Houston Cougars bio
 Central Michigan Chippewas bio

Living people
1996 births
American football quarterbacks
Montreal Alouettes players
Orlando Guardians players
Tennessee Volunteers football players
Houston Cougars football players
Central Michigan Chippewas football players